A davit (pronounced "dayvit" or see Wiktionary) is any of various crane-like devices used on a ship for supporting, raising, and lowering equipment such as boats and anchors.

Davit systems are most often used to lower an emergency lifeboat to the embarkation level to be boarded. The lifeboat davit has falls (now made of wire, historically of manila rope) that are used to lower the lifeboat into the water. Davits can also be used as man-overboard safety devices to retrieve personnel from the water.

The maintaining and operation of davits is all under jurisdiction of the International Maritime Organization. The regulations are enforced by the country's own coast guard.

Development 
Davits were first devised in about 1600 for use by whaling ships in the Greenland whaling grounds. They began to be introduced into Royal Navy warships in the late 18th-century and originally took the form of squared baulks of timber. Curved iron davits began to be introduced later in the 19th century.

Development of the davit has also been in terms of material. Traditionally davits have been made in aluminium or steel but recent advances in composite material have led to the manufacture of davits in carbon fibre which has an excellent power to weight ratio. This means davits can be stowed away when not in use and the same davit used in multiple deck sockets fitted permanently on deck.

Lifeboat types 

Davits are designed to fit into deck spaces that the naval architects deemed necessary:

 Radial (obsolete) – Hand powered davit. This type was used on the lifeboats of the RMS Lusitania. Each arm must be rotated out manually; uses manila rope falls. Goose-neck shape to the arm that is swung out.
 Mechanical (obsolete) – This type is like the radial davit, but both arms are moved out at the same time using a screw system; uses manila rope falls. An example is the Welin Quadrant davit type used on RMS Titanic.
 Gravity (industry standard) – There are multiple forms; one man can operate; uses wire falls.
 Roller – Davit slides down a track, bringing the davit to the embarkation deck.
 Single pivot – One pivot point where the lifeboat is moved over the side of the craft.
 Multi-pivot – Common on promenade decks of cruise ships. Useful where space is limited.
 Free fall – Lifeboat slides right off vessel. Lifeboat must be an enclosed type. Main type of Davit on merchant ships now. This type does not use falls.
 Fixed – Common on oil rigs. Lifeboat is hung above the water (at embarkation level) and lowered into the water.

Components 

 Liferaft These can be enclosed, partially enclosed, or open. (There are pictures of these on the page already so no description is added)
 Frapping lines These lines are used on all davits except the fixed and freefall davits. The frapping lines are used to pull the lifeboat over to the embarkation deck along with the tricing pendant to be loaded.
 Gripes Ropes used to hold the lifeboat in the stored position while underway.
 Tricing pendants Lines used to initially pull the lifeboat over to the embarkation deck so that the frapping lines can be connected.
 Falls	The wires which lift or lower the lifeboat are known as falls.

Release mechanisms 

There are three basic systems used to release the lifeboat from the davit. (Coast Guard Questions are for the Rottmer, On-Load releasing gear)

 On-load For this style of release mechanism, the lifeboat can be released at any point from the davit. This type of system allows a lifeboat to be released when it is not in the water, whether this is because of the emergency or an accident. Because of this, during an evacuation the release mechanism must be watched to make sure there is not an accidental activation.
 Off-load This release mechanism requires the weight (load) of the lifeboat to not be on the hook when it is released. This includes the Titanic-era Monomony hook design that requires someone to remove the hook from the lifeboat by hand. But this type also includes the hydrostatic system many lifeboats use now. For this, a float is raised up and engages the release once the craft is in the water to the right depth.
 Free-fall This type of release mechanism is very basic. The (enclosed) lifeboat is on a ramp and slides down and off of the ship when engaged. This is done by pumping a lever that is inside the lifeboat by the pilot. If there is not enough hydraulic pressure to release the stop fall, a pump on the inside must be rotated to build up the hydraulic pressure to release the lifeboats stopfall hook. Once the stopfall hook (hook attaching the lifeboat to the davit that holds it to the ship) is released the lifeboat will slide off the ramp and into the water. This type of lifeboat is more common due to its quick deployment and ease of operation.

Procedure 

For all lifeboats using a roller gravity davit and Rottmer releasing gear, this is the procedure:

 Make sure the davit tracks are clear of debris
 Remove the lifeboat cover if applicable 
 Put in the lifeboat plugs
 At this time the Rottmer releasing gear is checked to be secure.
 Attach the sea painter to the bow of the ship.
 Remove the gripes from the lifeboat. 
 Make sure the gripes preventing bar is free from the track.
 Have the assigned brake man life the braking bar and lower the lifeboat to the embarkation deck. 
 Now that the tricing pendants have pulled the lifeboat in close, attach the frapping lines to the wire falls by passing them to a worker who is on the lifeboat.
 Load the lifeboat. Load one person at a time and seat them so their weight is distributed between the two sides.
 Have the brake man raise the lifeboat slightly so the workers can release the tricing pendants.
 Brake man lifts bar and lowers the vessel into the water.
 Operate the Rottmer releasing gear and release the davit on the crest of a wave.
 If ship is sinking, pull toggle pin to release the sea painter from the ship.

During this procedure, if the lifeboat has air-cooled engines start it at the beginning. If it has a water-cooled engine start the engine after the lifeboat is in the water.

References 

Watercraft components
Vertical transport devices
Lifeboats